All Is Not Well is the first full-length album released by American band Tura Satana, under their original name Manhole.  The album was reissued in 1998 with five live bonus tracks and new packaging to reflect the bands change in name.

Track listing 
All songs written by Tairrie B and Scott Ueda, except where noted.
"Hypocrite" — 2:33
"Sickness" (Tarrie B, Scott Ueda, Rico Villasenor) — 3:53
"Kiss or Kill" — 3:03
"Break" — 3:29
"Empty" — 2:31
"Put Your Head Out" — 2:55
"Victim" — 3:00
"Clean" — 3:03
"Roughness" (Tairrie B, Ueda, Ross Robinson, Marty Ramirez) — 2:44
"Six Feet Deep" — 3:01
"Cycle of Violence" — 3:05
"Down" (Ueda, Robinson, Kevin Beber, Lynn Strait) — 2:58 (featuring Lynn Strait of Snot)
"Down (Reprise)" — 1:42

Bonus tracks
"Victim" (live) — 3:59 (featuring Aimee Echo of Human Waste Project)
"Hard Times" (live) — 1:47
"Flux" (Tura Satana) (live) — 4:01
"Storage" (Tairrie B.) (live) — 3:40
"Dry" (Ueda) (live) — 3:35

Personnel 
Adapted from liner notes and Bandcamp.
Tairrie B - Vocals
Scott Ueda- Guitar
Rico Villasenor - Bass
Marcelo Palomino - Drums
Ross Robinson - Producer, Mixer
Chuck Johnson - Engineer, Mixer
Rob Agnelo - 2nd Engineer

References

1996 debut albums
Tura Satana (band) albums
Albums produced by Ross Robinson
Noise Records albums